Ożarów Mazowiecki  is a town in Poland, just to the west of Warsaw, in Mazowsze Voivodship.
It is the capital of Warsaw West County (since January 1, 2006).  Its population numbers 11,311 (2018).

Transport
The Polish National road 92 and Voivodeship roads 701, 718, 735 pass through Ożarów, and the A2 motoway runs nearby, south of the town.

External links
 Official town webpage
 Jewish Community in Ożarów Mazowiecki on Virtual Shtetl

Cities and towns in Masovian Voivodeship
Warsaw West County